Vosper may refer to:

People
Cyril Vosper (1935–2004), a British Scientologist and, later, critic of Scientology
Dennis Vosper, Baron Runcorn (1916–1968), British Conservative politician
Frank Vosper (1899–1937), British actor and playwright
Frederick Vosper (1869–1901), an Australian politician and republican
Sydney Curnow Vosper (1866–1942), a painter and artist
Tessa Ann Vosper Blackstone, Baroness Blackstone (born 1942), a British Labour politician

Organizations
Vosper & Company, a defunct British shipbuilder
VT Group, formerly known as Vosper Thornycroft, a British shipbuilder

Other
Sholing F.C., formerly known as Vosper Thorneycroft FC, a British football club